Hamamözü District is a district of Amasya Province of Turkey. Its seat is the town Hamamözü. Its area is 204 km2, and its population is 3,565 (2021).

Composition
There is one municipality in Hamamözü District:
 Hamamözü

There are 17 villages in Hamamözü District:

 Alanköy
 Arpadere
 Çayköy
 Damladere
 Dedeköy
 Göçeri
 Gölköy
 Hıdırlar
 Kızılcaören
 Mağaraobruğu
 Omarca
 Sarayözü
 Tekçam
 Tepeköy
 Tutkunlar
 Yemişen
 Yukarıovacık

References

Districts of Amasya Province